Lars Passgård (14 February 1941 – 16 March 2003) was a Swedish actor and theatre director. He appeared in more than 30 films and television shows between 1961 and 2002.

Biography

Early life and education
Passgård grew up in Smålandsstenar, a locality in Jönköping County. He acted in amateur theater in Smålandsstenar and, in 1959, began training at the Malmö City Theatre, which is now designated as the Malmö Theatre Academy and is a part of Lund University.

Career
After completing his studies, Malmö City Theatre became his main stage. Although, he also made guest appearances on theater stages in both Sweden and Denmark. In 1961, he made his theater debut in Malmö and his film debut in Ingmar Bergman's Through a Glass Darkly, which, in part, won him roles in Bo Widerberg's 1963 feature debut Barnvagnen and the 1963 Hollywood film The Prize. Passgård later acted in Yngve Gamlin's 1965 film The Chasers, which won the Silver Bear Extraordinary Jury Prize at the 16th Berlin International Film Festival in 1966.

In 1961, his popularity grew and he became a teen idol for his participation in the TV entertainment series Bialitt. Between 1963 and 1966, Passgård was part of the TV-theater ensemble on SVT and played at various private theaters in Stockholm, including the Stockholm City Theatre from 1965 to 1966 and 1970 to 1971, and the Royal Dramatic Theatre between 1971 and 1973. He also played at the Royal Danish Theatre in Copenhagen and received much attention for his performance of Prince Hamlet in William Shakespeare's Hamlet in Aalborg in 1969. After his time spent at the Royal Danish Theatre, he returned to Malmö, where he was the theater's drama director between 1986 and 1989.

In 1962 he received the Swedish Union for Theatre, Artists and Media's Daniel Engdahl scholarship, and in 1985 he received Kvällsposten's Thalia Prize.

Death and legacy
Passgård died in on 16 March 2003 in Malmö after a brief illness. He was interred in Limhamn at the cemetery of Limhamn Church.

Following his death, Lars' mother Elvy Passgård instituted a theater scholarship, dedicated to his memory, to be shared out among theater students at the Malmö Theatre Academy of Lund University. The total fund allocates 1,000,000 Swedish kronor to manage. The scholarship holder must be "young and promising, talented and focused on the nature of the spectacle of dramatic or comic art".

Filmography

Film

Television

Theatre

Roles (not complete)

References

External links

1941 births
2003 deaths
20th-century Swedish male actors
Swedish male film actors
Swedish male television actors
People from Borås
Actors from Malmö